Boleslav Leopoldovich Yavorsky (June 22, 1877, Kharkiv – November 26, 1942) was a Russian musicologist, music teacher, administrator and pianist.

Through his teachings and editorial positions he heavily influenced Soviet music theory. However, outside Soviet circles, he has had little impact.

Biography 
He studied at the Moscow Conservatory under Sergei Taneyev. He taught at the Kiev Conservatory until 1919, the First Music Tekhnikum in Moscow, which he founded, and the Moscow Conservatory.

He chaired the music section of Narkompros from 1922 to 1930.

Yavorsky was a friend, mentor and confidant of the composer Dmitri Shostakovich and played an important role in the latter's development. He often used his influence to further Shostakovich's career.

His students included Rostislav Berberov, Vladimir Aleksandrovich Dukelsky (also known as Vernon Duke), Alexei Fedorovich Kozlovsky, Alexander Abramovich Krein, Sergei Protopopov, Mykola Leontovych, Tatiana Grigorievna Shaborkina (director of the Scriabin Museum from 1941–84), Maria Wiłkomirska, and Isaak Rabinovich, whose son Boleslav Rabinovich was named after Isaak's beloved teacher.

Notes

References

Further reading

1877 births
1942 deaths
Musicians from Kharkiv
People from Kharkov Governorate
Russian music theorists
Russian music educators
Russian classical pianists
Male classical pianists
R. Glier Kyiv Institute of Music alumni
Musicians from the Russian Empire
Soviet musicians